The list of ship decommissionings in 1957 includes a chronological list of all ships decommissioned in 1957.


See also 

1957
 Ship decommissionings
Ship